La Farge is a village along the Kickapoo River in Vernon County, Wisconsin, United States. The population was 746 at the 2010 census.

Geography
La Farge is located at  (43.576572, -90.638239).

The Kickapoo River flows through the village.

Demographics

2010 census
As of the census of 2010, there were 746 people, 332 households, and 186 families living in the village. The racial makeup of the village was 97.1% White, 0.3% African American, 1.6% Native American, 0.1% Asian, 0.1% from other races, and 0.8% from two or more races. Hispanic or Latino of any race were 0.4% of the population.

There were 332 households, of which 24.7% had children under the age of 18 living with them, 38.0% were married couples living together, 11.7% had a female householder with no husband present, 6.3% had a male householder with no wife present, and 44.0% were non-families. 37.3% of all households were made up of individuals, and 15.9% had someone living alone who was 65 years of age or older. The average household size was 2.17 and the average family size was 2.78.

The median age in the village was 42.8 years. 20.5% of residents were under the age of 18; 7.7% were between the ages of 18 and 24; 24.7% were from 25 to 44; 28.1% were from 45 to 64; and 19% were 65 years of age or older. The gender makeup of the village was 50.7% male and 49.3% female.

2000 census
As of the census of 2000, there were 775 people, 342 households, and 200 families living in the village. The population density was 745.4 people per square mile (287.7/km2). There were 366 housing units at an average density of 352.0 per square mile (135.9/km2). The racial makeup of the village was 97.29% White, 0.13% African American, 0.65% Native American, 0.13% Pacific Islander, 0.52% from other races, and 1.29% from two or more races. Hispanic or Latino of any race were 0.65% of the population.

There were 342 households, out of which 26.3% had children under the age of 18 living with them, 43.6% were married couples living together, 9.4% had a female householder with no husband present, and 41.5% were non-families. 38.6% of all households were made up of individuals, and 22.2% had someone living alone who was 65 years of age or older. The average household size was 2.20 and the average family size was 2.90.

In the village, the population was spread out, with 25.7% under the age of 18, 7.9% from 18 to 24, 22.1% from 25 to 44, 24.5% from 45 to 64, and 19.9% who were 65 years of age or older. The median age was 41 years. For every 100 females, there were 95.2 males. For every 100 females age 18 and over, there were 96.6 males.

The median income for a household in the village was $23,083, and the median income for a family was $33,750. Males had a median income of $26,818 versus $19,833 for females. The per capita income for the village was $14,191. About 12.1% of families and 14.4% of the population were below the poverty line, including 18.3% of those under age 18 and 10.7% of those age 65 or over.

Transportation
La Farge is located at 'The Corners', the intersections, and concurrency of Wisconsin Highway 82, and Wisconsin Highway 131.

Economy
La Farge is home to the headquarters of Organic Valley, an organic farmer-owned cooperative.

References

External links
 La Farge, Wisconsin

Villages in Vernon County, Wisconsin
Villages in Wisconsin